Home care in the United Kingdom (also referred to as domiciliary care, social care, or in-home care) is supportive care provided in the home. Care may be provided by licensed healthcare professionals who provide medical care needs or by professional caregivers who provide daily care to help to ensure the activities of daily living (ADLs) are met. In home medical care is often and more accurately referred to as home health care or formal care. Often, the term home health care is used to distinguish it from non-medical care, custodial care, or private-duty care which is care that is provided by persons who are not nurses, doctors, or other licensed medical personnel.

The COVID-19 pandemic in the United Kingdom saw a huge acceleration in digital transformation in the sector.  Digital systems were used to create mandatory reminders for hand washing, symptom checking and sanitisation.  Risk assessment forms, care plans and induction documents were digitised.

The number of domiciliary care jobs overtook the number of roles in care homes in 2020. In 2021 the workforce in CQC regulated non-residential care services increased by 40,000 jobs or about 7%, while the number of care home jobs remained stable, or began to decrease.

The vacancy rate in homecare reached 13.5% in May 2022.  After the removal of the Infection Control and Testing Fund at the end of March 2022  96% of homecare workers got no or low pay whilst isolating after a positive COVID-19 test, causing many to leave for jobs where isolation is not required or full sick pay is available. Increasing fuel prices are also a significant issue.

Home care providers
Home care is purchased by the service user directly from independent home care agencies or as part of the statutory responsibility of social services departments of local authorities who either provide care by their own employees or commission services from independent agencies. Care can also be purchased directly from independent carers or via care platforms. Care is usually provided once or twice a day with the aim of keeping frail or disabled people healthy and independent though can extend to full-time help by a live-in nurse or professional carer.

The United Kingdom Home Care Association is the trade organisation for providers of care at home.

Statutory regulation

Home care agencies are regulated by statutory bodies in three of the four home nations. The regulator's function is to ensure that home care agencies work within the applicable legislation:

England

 Regulator: The Care Quality Commission (CQC)
 The Health and Social Care Act 2008
 The Health and Social Care Act 2008 (Regulated Activities) Regulations 2010

Wales

 Regulator: The Care and Social Services Inspectorate Wales (CSSIW)
 The Care Standards Act 2000
 The Domiciliary Care Agencies (Wales) Regulations 2004

Scotland

 Regulator: The Care Commission
 The Regulation of Care (Scotland) Act 2001

Northern Ireland

Legislation covering the homecare sector in Northern Ireland is not yet fully operational (as at December 2007).

Regulator: The Regulation and Quality Improvement Authority (RQIA)
 The Health and Personal Social Services (Quality, Improvement and Regulation)(Northern Ireland) Order 2003
 Domiciliary Care Agency Regulations (Northern Ireland) 2007
 Domiciliary Care Agencies National Minimum Standards (not published as at December 2007)

The precise arrangements of a care package can have implications for planning law.  Residential institutions fall into Class C2 while residential dwellings fall into Class C3.  This distinction can have significant planning and development implications.

See also
 Home care
 Nursing home care in the United Kingdom
 Home care in the United States

References

Caregiving
Social care in the United Kingdom